Tikva may refer to:

Arts and entertainment:
Tikva Records, a Jewish American record label which existed from the 1940s to the 1970s

People:
Tikva Frymer-Kensky (1943–2006), Professor at the University of Chicago Divinity School
Avi Tikva (born 1976), retired Israeli professional association footballer
Shalom Tikva (born 1965), former Israeli international footballer

Places:
Tikva Quarter or Hatikva Quarter, a poor and working class neighbourhood in south-eastern Tel Aviv, Israel
Ganei Tikva, a local council in Israel, bordering Kiryat Ono to the west, Petah Tikva to the north, Gat Rimon to the east and Savyon to the south
Petah Tikva, known as Em HaMoshavot, a city in the Center District of Israel, east of Tel Aviv
Sha'arei Tikva, an Israeli settlement and a communal village northeast of Rosh HaAyin

See also
Hatikvah
TIVA (disambiguation)
Tika (disambiguation)